The International Conference on Bioinformatics (InCoB) is a scientific conference on bioinformatics aimed at scientists in the Asia Pacific region. It has been held annually since 2002. Originally organised by coordination between the Asia Pacific Bioinformatics Network (APBioNet) and the Thailand National Center for Genetic Engineering and Biotechnology (BIOTEC) in 2002, the meeting has since been the flagship conference of the APBioNet, where APBioNet's Annual General Meeting is held.

Scientific publications
Since 2006, InCoB has been partnering with BMC Bioinformatics to publish an InCoB Special Conference Issue of top papers presented at the conference. In 2007, an additional tie-up with the Bioinformation journal was established in addition to the BMC Bioinformatics issue.

Technological placeshifting
Since 2007, InCoB held in Hong Kong University of Science and Technology, has been placeshifted in an additional location in a developing country venue, namely the Vietnam National University, Hanoi (VNU) through the advanced videoconferencing project of APAN and TEIN2. In 2015, InCoB was organised jointly with the International Conference on Genome Informatics in an attempt to increase effectiveness and scalability.

Satellite training workshops
Since 2007, at the VNU site coordinated by the Institute of Biotechnology Hanoi (IBT), InCoB coordinated with the International Union for Biochemists and Molecular Biologists (IUBMB), the Federation of Asian Oceanian Biochemists and Molecular Biologists (FAOBMB) and APBioNet to hold a two-week bioinformatics training course with course faculty from Karolinska Institutet, NCBI and National University of Singapore, supported by the S* Alliance for Bioinformatics Education and BioSlax, a software development project hosted at NUS as part of an ASEAN SubCommittee on Biotechnology (SCB) project. This collaboration with IUBMB and FAOBMB continues in 2008 with a bioinformatics education workshop in Taipei, Taiwan, where the main meeting of InCoB 2008 will be situated.

Past and present conferences

External links 
 APBioNet Website
 InCoB Website

References

Biology conferences
Computer science conferences
Recurring events established in 2002